The Bridges of Pittsburgh play an important role in the city's transportation system. Without bridges, the Pittsburgh region would be a series of fragmented valleys, hillsides, river plains, and isolated communities.

A 2006 study determined that, at the time, Pittsburgh had 446 bridges. With its proximity to three major rivers and countless hills and ravines, Pittsburgh is known as "The City of Bridges".

History

Pittsburgh's first river bridges, made of wood and long since replaced, opened in 1818 at Smithfield Street and 1819 at Sixth Street (then St. Clair Street). The city's oldest in-service bridge is the current Smithfield Street Bridge, which opened in 1883; it was designated a National Historic Landmark in 1976. Pittsburgh waged a massive road and bridge building campaign from 1924 to 1940; most of Pittsburgh's oldest major bridges date from this period. The coming of the Interstate Highway System triggered more construction in the second half of the twentieth century, as vehicular speed and throughput requirements increased. The result of more than 100 years of bridge building is a collection of most of the major types of bridge (suspension, cantilever, arch, etc.), mostly built from locally produced steel, including about forty river spans.

Many of the bridges in the Downtown area are colored Aztec Gold, either constructed as such or painted afterward, to match the city's official colors of black and gold. A few old and out-of-service bridges, such as the Hot Metal Bridge (which stood dormant until reopening as a passenger bridge in the year 2000), are exceptions to this rule.

Degrading bridge conditions 

According to a 2011 study by Transportation for America, 1,194 bridges in the Pittsburgh area—or 30.4%—were deficient, the highest proportion in the nation.

On February 8, 2008, the Birmingham Bridge suffered a failure of its rocker bearings, causing the deck to drop eight inches, prompting a closure of the bridge. The bridge was repaired and fully reopened on September 8, 2008

On January 28, 2022, the Fern Hollow Bridge across Frick Park collapsed, forcing the closure of Forbes Avenue through the park. The bridge was covered with snow when it collapsed at 6:39 a.m. local time as it was being crossed by several cars and a bus.

Major bridges
This table lists all bridges crossing the Allegheny, Monongahela and Ohio rivers in the City of Pittsburgh limits. Other large or notable bridges are also included.

Monongahela River

Allegheny River

Ohio River

Other bridges
This table lists some other major bridges within the City of Pittsburgh limits.

Notable bridges

The Fort Pitt Bridge is a steel bowstring arch bridge that spans the Monongahela River near its confluence with the Allegheny River at the point. It carries Interstate 376 between the Fort Pitt Tunnel and Point State Park.
The Fort Duquesne Bridge is a steel tied arch bridge that spans the Allegheny River in Pittsburgh. It carries Pennsylvania Route 65 / Interstate 279 (North Shore Expressway), which runs through Downtown Pittsburgh's Golden Triangle towards Interstate 79.
The West End Bridge is a large steel bowstring arch bridge which crosses the Ohio River. It is the first bridge on the Ohio River heading toward the Mississippi River. The bridge carries U.S. Route 19.
The Liberty Bridge crosses over the Monongahela River, joining Interstate 579 at its southern terminus.
The Three Sisters are three parallel, nearly identical self-anchored suspension bridges that cross the Allegheny River at 6th, 7th, and 9th streets. The bridges have been recently renamed for prominent Pittsburgh residents: Roberto Clemente Bridge, Andy Warhol Bridge, and Rachel Carson Bridge.
The Smithfield Street Bridge is a lenticular truss bridge crossing the Monongahela River. Its two main lenticular spans make the bridge very recognizable. It is a National Historic Civil Engineering Landmark, according to a plaque on the bridge.

See also
 
 
 
 List of tunnels in Pittsburgh
 Crossings of the Ohio River in Pennsylvania
 Crossings of the Allegheny River in Pennsylvania
 Crossings of the Monongahela River in Pennsylvania
 List of bridges and tunnels in New York City

References

External links
Allegheny County entry at Historic Bridges

 
Bridges in Pennsylvania
Pittsburgh-related lists